Air Vice Marshal Cecil Vivian Parker, MVC, VM is a former air officer of the Indian Air Force. During the Indo-Pak War of 1971, he was awarded the Maha Vir Chakra, India's second highest gallantry Award. He last served as the Commandant of the Air Force Academy.

Early life
Parker was born in Secunderabad, India to P. R. Parker and E. S. Parker.

Military career
Parker was commissioned into the Indian Air Force on 31 Aug 1952.
After joining the Indian Air Force, he saw action in both the 1965 and 1971 Indo-Pakistan Wars. 

In October 1966, as Wing Commander, he formed an operational training unit and was the Unit's first Commanding Officer. Here, he implemented a high level of instructional technique, standardisation and ensured a high quality of training for the pupils that passed through the unit, for which he was awarded the Vayu Sena Medal.

Indo-Pak War of 1971
During the 1971 war, as commanding officer of the No. 20 Squadron IAF, a fighter bomber squadron equipped with Hawker Hunter aircraft. 
He also led a number of deep penetration missions into Pakistani territory attacking heavily defended targets including Pakistani airfields, oil refineries and in support of Army operations. On one of the missions, his formation was attacked by Pakistani F-86 Sabre aircraft. In the ensuing air fight, Wing Commander Parker shot down one Sabre and heavily damaged another. During another strike mission, Wing Commander Parker attacked an oil refinery at Attock, Pakistan, in the face of intense anti-aircraft and small arms fire, causing serious damage to the refinery. For bravery and leadership displayed in combat missions, Wing Commander Parker was awarded the Mahavir Chakra, India's second highest gallantry award.

Wing Commander Parker led what was later called the greatest IAF air strike and acknowledged by a Pakistani Air Force officer, Air Commodore, M. Kaiser Tufail (retd), in his book 'In the Ring and on Its Feet'. In the book, he said the Indian Hunter aircraft destroyed five Pakistani F-86 Sabre jets during the raid on its airbase at Murid. The F86 was the Pakistan Air Force's premiere aircraft and the single-biggest challenge for the IAF in air battles in the 1965 and 1971 wars.

Maha Vir Chakra Citation 
The citation for the Maha Vir Chakra reads as follows:

Post-war career
During his career in the IAF spanning 35 years, he created a record of flying 22 types of aircraft and logged 3,850 flying hours. 

Parker later rose to the rank of Air Vice Marshal in July 1983, before retiring on 31 Aug 1986.

Writing 
Parker wrote a book, AIRLOOMS – Random Recollections of an Ancient Aviator.

References

Indian Air Force officers
Indian aviators
Pilots of the Indo-Pakistani War of 1965
Pilots of the Indo-Pakistani War of 1971
Indian military personnel of the Indo-Pakistani War of 1971
Recipients of the Maha Vir Chakra
Recipients of the Vayu Sena Medal
People from Secunderabad
Commandants of the Indian Air Force Academy